Terry Ferguson is an Irish former sportsperson who played Gaelic football for the Gaeil Colmcille CLG club and at senior level for the Meath county team in the 1980s and 1990s.

References

Year of birth missing (living people)
Living people
Gaelic football backs
Meath inter-county Gaelic footballers
Winners of two All-Ireland medals (Gaelic football)